Stromberg, Strömberg, Strømberg,
Strombergs, 
Štrombergs, etc. is a surname from Denmark, Finland, Germany, Norway and Sweden and now common in the English language where it is occasionally written as Stroemberg.

People
Anna-Belle Strömberg (born 1965), Swedish politician
Arne Strömberg (1920–1988), Swedish ice hockey coach
Arvid Strömberg (b. 1991), Swedish ice hockey player
Bill Stromberg, former CEO of T. Rowe Price
Carin Strömberg (b. 1993), Swedish handball player 
Charlotte Strömberg (b. 1959), Swedish corporate leader
Conny Strömberg (b. 1975), Swedish former ice hockey left winger
Eugén Strömberg (1895–1971), Swedish military doctor
Ewa Strömberg, Swedish actress  
Fredrik Strömberg, Swedish journalist and author
Glenn Strömberg (b. 1960), Swedish former soccer player
Gustaf Strömberg (1882–1962), Swedish-American astronomer
Holger Stromberg, German chef
Hunt Stromberg (1894–1968), American film producer
Hunt Stromberg Jr. (1923–1986), American Broadway, radio and television producer
Johan Peter Strömberg (1773–1834), Swedish actor, dancer and theatre director
John Stromberg (1853–1902), American songwriter, composer, and conductor born in Canada
Keaton Stromberg (b. 1996), American rap rock  musician
Kim Strömberg (b. 1987), Finnish professional ice hockey winger
Lyndon Stromberg, American sculptor and designer
Malin Strömberg, former Swedish Olympic swimmer 
Mika Strömberg, Finnish professional ice hockey defenceman
Mikko Strömberg (born 1979), Finnish former professional ice hockey goaltender
Ole Christian Strømberg (b. 1972), Norwegian bobsledder
Paul Griffith Stromberg (1892–1952), American newspaper owner/editor and politician
Robert Stromberg (b. 1965), American special effects artist, designer and filmmaker
Robin Strömberg (b. 1992), Swedish footballer
Thorvald Strömberg, Finnish Olympic sprint canoer
Ulf Strömberg (1959– 2001), Swedish cameraman shot and killed by robbers in Afghanistan while covering the War in Afghanistan
Wesley Stromberg (b. 1993), American rap rock  musician

Fictional characters
Karl Stromberg, character in the James Bond film The Spy Who Loved Me

See also
Stramberg
Stromberg (disambiguation)

Danish-language surnames
English-language surnames
Finnish-language surnames
German-language surnames
Norwegian-language surnames
Swedish-language surnames